This is a list of historical names for the Ohio River, or portions thereof, as compiled by the Geographic Names Information System of the United States Geological Survey.  The Board on Geographic Names settled on "Ohio River" as the river's official name in 1931, but the Decision Card, submitted on December 31, 1930 and approved on October 7, 1931 states that naming it the Ohio river was a "Restatement of previous decision"

Aaboukingon
Akansea River
Alagany River
River Allegane
Allegany River
Allegeny River
Alleghany River
Alliganey River (See also Allegheny River)
Baudrane River
Bella Ribera
Belle-Rivière
La Belle Riviere
LaBelle Riviere
Cau-si-sip-i-on-e
Fleuve Chucagoa
Cubach
Dono
Eagle River
Fair River
Hohio River
Kan-zan-za River
Ki-to-no
Kis-ke-ba-la-se-be River
Kis-ke-pi-la-se-pe River
Kiskepila Sepe
Kottono-cepe
Ochio
Oheeo
O-hee-yo
Oheezuh
O-he-zun River
O-he-zun-River
O-he-zun-an-de-wa River
Ohi
Ohio
Il Fiume Ohio
Ohionhiio
Ohiopeckhanne
Ohiople
O-H-I-o-ple
O-h-i-o-ple
O-li-gen-si-pen
Olighin-cipou River
Ouabache
La Riviere Ouabache (See also Wabash River)
Ouabouskigon
Oyeu River
Oyo
O-Yo
L'Oyo Riviere
La Riviere Oyo
Oyo-peck-han-ne
Pa-la-wa-the pee River
Palawa Thepiki
Sabsquigs River
Fleuve Saint Louis
Sault River
Splawacipiki River
Turkey River

Sources

Names
Alternative place names